Life's Whirlpool may refer to:
 Life's Whirlpool (1917 film), an American silent drama film
 Life's Whirlpool (1916 film), an American silent drama film